Elections to Belfast City Council were held on 19 May 1993 on the same day as the other Northern Irish local government elections. The election used nine district electoral areas to elect a total of 51 councillors, most representing the more heavily populated north and west.

The UUP remained the largest party, and Reg Empey became the Lord Mayor.

Election results

Note: "Votes" are the first preference votes.

Districts summary

|- class="unsortable" align="centre"
!rowspan=2 align="left"|Ward
! % 
!Cllrs
! %
!Cllrs
! %
!Cllrs
! %
!Cllrs
! %
!Cllrs
! %
!Cllrs
! %
!Cllrs
!rowspan=2|TotalCllrs
|- class="unsortable" align="center"
!colspan=2 bgcolor="" | UUP
!colspan=2 bgcolor="" | Sinn Féin
!colspan=2 bgcolor="" | DUP
!colspan=2 bgcolor=""| SDLP
!colspan=2 bgcolor="" | Alliance
!colspan=2 bgcolor="" | PUP
!colspan=2 bgcolor="white"| Others
|-
|align="left"|Balmoral
|bgcolor="40BFF5"|30.6
|bgcolor="40BFF5"|2
|0.0
|0
|23.4
|2
|19.1
|1
|18.6
|1
|0.0
|0
|8.3
|0
|6
|-
|align="left"|Castle
|bgcolor="40BFF5"|28.2
|bgcolor="40BFF5"|2
|4.8
|0
|20.7
|1
|22.4
|2
|9.8
|0
|0.0
|0
|14.1
|1
|6
|-
|align="left"|Court
|bgcolor="40BFF5"|38.9
|bgcolor="40BFF5"|2
|0.0
|0
|25.0
|1
|0.0
|0
|3.9
|0
|22.7
|1
|9.5
|1
|5
|-
|align="left"|Laganbank
|bgcolor="40BFF5"|27.7
|bgcolor="40BFF5"|2
|9.4
|0
|10.5
|0
|26.9
|2
|16.5
|1
|0.0
|0
|9.0
|0
|5
|-
|align="left"|Lower Falls
|0.0
|0
|bgcolor="#008800"|71.2
|bgcolor="#008800"|4
|0.0
|0
|21.0
|1
|0.8
|0
|0.0
|0
|6.9
|0
|5
|-
|align="left"|Oldpark
|22.8
|2
|bgcolor="#008800"|37.8
|bgcolor="#008800"|3
|8.9
|0
|15.8
|1
|3.3
|0
|0.0
|0
|11.4
|1
|6
|-
|align="left"|Pottinger
|27.1
|2
|6.5
|0
|bgcolor="#D46A4C"|41.8
|bgcolor="#D46A4C"|3
|0.0
|0
|13.0
|1
|0.0
|0
|11.6
|0
|6
|-
|align="left"|Upper Falls
|0.0
|0
|bgcolor="#008800"|57.1
|bgcolor="#008800"|3
|1.3
|0
|35.4
|2
|1.1
|0
|0.0
|0
|5.1
|0
|5
|-
|align="left"|Victoria
|30.5
|3
|0.0
|0
|28.7
|2
|0.0
|0
|bgcolor="#F6CB2F"|34.5
|bgcolor="#F6CB2F"|2
|0.0
|0
|6.3
|0
|7
|- class="unsortable" class="sortbottom" style="background:#C9C9C9"
|align="left"| Total
|22.0
|15
|22.7
|10
|17.1
|9
|15.9
|9
|11.2
|5
|1.5
|1
|9.6
|2
|51
|-
|}

District results

Balmoral

1989: 2 x UUP, 1 x DUP, 1 x SDLP, 1 x Alliance
1993: 2 x UUP, 2 x DUP, 1 x SDLP, 1 x Alliance
1989-1993 Change: DUP gain due to the addition of one seat

Castle

1989: 2 x Independent Unionist, 1 x UUP, 1 SDLP, 1 x DUP, 1 x Alliance 
1993: 2 x UUP, 2 SDLP, 1 x DUP, 1 x Independent Unionist 
1989-1993 Change: UUP and SDLP gain from Independent Unionist and Alliance

Court

1989: 2 x UUP, 1 x DUP, 1 x PUP, 1 x Protestant Unionist, 1 x Independent Unionist
1993: 2 x UUP, 1 x DUP, 1 x PUP, 1 x Independent Unionist
1989-1993 Change: Protestant Unionist loss due to the reduction of one seat

Laganbank

1989: 2 x UUP, 1 x SDLP, 1 x Alliance, 1 x DUP 
1993: 2 x UUP, 2 x SDLP, 1 x Alliance 
1989-1993 Change: SDLP gain from DUP

Lower Falls

1989: 3 x Sinn Féin, 2 x SDLP
1993: 4 x Sinn Féin, 1 x SDLP
1989-1993 Change: Sinn Féin gain from SDLP

Oldpark

1989: 2 x Sinn Féin, 2 x UUP, 1 x SDLP, 1 x Workers' Party
1993: 3 x Sinn Féin, 2 x UUP, 1 x SDLP
1989-1993 Change: Sinn Féin gain from Workers' Party

Pottinger

1989: 2 x DUP, 2 x UUP, 1 x Alliance, 1 Independent Unionist
1993: 3 x DUP, 2 x UUP, 1 x Alliance
1989-1993 Change: DUP gain from Independent Unionist

Upper Falls

1989: 3 x Sinn Féin, 2 x SDLP
1993: 3 x Sinn Féin, 2 x SDLP
1989-1993 Change: No change

Victoria

1989: 3 x UUP, 2 x Alliance, 2 x DUP
1993: 3 x UUP, 2 x Alliance, 2 x DUP
1989-1993 Change: No change

References

Belfast
Belfast City Council elections